Giaura tortricoides is a moth of the family Nolidae first described by Francis Walker in 1865. It is found in Sri Lanka, Japan, Andaman Islands, Borneo, Sumatra, Flores, Sulawesi, New Guinea, Bismarck Islands and Australia.

Description
Forewings dark brown. Some specimen with sub-dorsal longitudinal dark bar. Tymbal organs are absent. Larval food plant is Hibiscus tiliaceus. Caterpillar is smooth slightly spindle shaped and green. Head is black. Pupation occurs in a cocoon. Cocoon is pale grayish white and boat shaped.

References

External links
Heterocera Papua and West-Papua (Indonesian New Guinea) W.A.S. World Archives of Sciences Auto-Completed Monograph

Moths of Asia
Moths described in 1865
Nolidae